The 7.5 cm Infanteriegeschütz 37 (7.5 cm IG 37) was an infantry support gun, used by Germany during World War II. The guns were originally designated 7.5 cm PaK 37. The IG 37s were manufactured from carriages of 3.7 cm Pak 36s (and the nearly identical Soviet 3.7 cm PaK 158(r)) and a barrel designed originally for the IG 42 infantry support gun. The first 84 guns were delivered in June 1944. By the end of the war 1,304 guns were operational.

While the gun carriage was an old design, the gun itself was a new design created by Krupp, though the design had been shelved at the time of its conception. The gun has two distinctive features: the first is the large four-baffle muzzle brake and the second is the vertical sliding-block breech that was considered unusual for a Krupp designed gun. The breech operates in a semi-automatic fashion, in that once the gun was fired the breech block would open and eject the spent casing and remained open to allow for rapid reloading. The breech would then be closed once the next round was loaded and the gun was then ready to fire.

See also
7.5 cm leichtes Infanteriegeschütz 18
7.5 cm Infanteriegeschütz 42
Artillery
List of artillery

References

Sources
 http://www.lexikon-der-wehrmacht.de/Waffen/Infanteriegeschutze.htm (in German)
 Engelmann, Joachim and Scheibert, Horst. Deutsche Artillerie 1934-1945: Eine Dokumentation in Text, Skizzen und Bildern: Ausrüstung, Gliederung, Ausbildung, Führung, Einsatz. Limburg/Lahn, Germany: C. A. Starke, 1974
 Gander, Terry and Chamberlain, Peter. Weapons of the Third Reich: An Encyclopedic Survey of All Small Arms, Artillery and Special Weapons of the German Land Forces 1939-1945. New York: Doubleday, 1979 
 Hogg, Ian V. German Artillery of World War Two. 2nd corrected edition. Mechanicsville, PA: Stackpole Books, 1997 
 

World War II artillery of Germany
World War II field artillery
Infantry guns
75 mm artillery
Weapons and ammunition introduced in 1944